"Stay" is a doo-wop song written by Maurice Williams and first recorded in 1960 by Williams with his group the Zodiacs. Commercially successful versions were later also issued by the Hollies, the Four Seasons and Jackson Browne.

Maurice Williams original version
The song was written by Williams in 1953 when he was 15 years old. He had been trying to convince his date not to go home at 10 o'clock as she was supposed to. He lost the argument, but as he was to relate years later, "Like a flood, the words just came to me."

In 1960, the song was put on a demo by Williams and his band, the Zodiacs, but it attracted no interest until a ten-year-old heard it and impressed the band members with her positive reaction to the tune. The band's producer, Phil Gernhard, took it along with some other demos to New York City and played them for all the major record producers that they could access. Finally, Al Silver of Herald Records became interested, but insisted that the song be re-recorded as the demo's recording levels were too low. They also said that one line, "Let's have another smoke" would have to be removed in order for the song to be played on commercial radio. After the group recorded the tune again, it was released by Herald Records and was picked up by CKLW. It entered the U.S. Billboard Hot 100 on October 3, 1960,  and reached the number one spot on November 21, 1960. It was dislodged a week later by Elvis Presley's "Are You Lonesome Tonight?". On the Herald recording, Williams sang lead and Henry Gaston sang the falsetto chorus.

The original recording of "Stay" remains the shortest single ever to reach the top of the American record charts, at 1 minute 36 seconds. By 1990, it had sold more than 8 million copies. Its popularity revived when the Dirty Dancing soundtrack included it.

Chart history

Weekly charts
Maurice Williams & the Zodiacs

Year-end charts

The Hollies version
In November 1963, the song was released by British band the Hollies, whose version reached No. 8 on the UK Singles Chart. It remained on the chart for a total of 16 weeks. The song is from their debut album Stay with The Hollies.

The Four Seasons version

The Four Seasons' version was first released on their June 1963 album The 4 Seasons Sing Ain't That a Shame and 11 Others; it was later released as a single in December 1963. Vee Jay originally released it as the B-side of "Peanuts" in December, but when disc jockeys started to "turn the single over" to play "Stay" on the air, the record company superseded the single with a new one with "Stay" as the A-side and "Goodnight My Love" as the new B-side.<ref>Tom Neely, Goldmine Price Guide to 45 RPM Records, 5th edition (KP Books, 2005) </ref> It peaked at number 16 on the US Billboard Hot 100 in April 1964.

Jackson Browne version

A version of the song with revised lyrics is the last track on Jackson Browne's 1977 album Running on Empty. The song, which follows on the heels of Browne's "The Load-Out" begs the audience to stay for an encore and includes an extensive playout. It includes backing contributions from David Lindley and Rosemary Butler.  Billboard described this version as "spirited and gospel-like".  Cash Box said that it has "effective guitar and keyboard solos and an easy beat" and "pleasing lead vocals", and that "David Lindley draws appreciation from the audience with his teasing falsetto".  Record World said that "David Lindley's falsetto vocals and guitar lend an able hand, and the live quality is appealing."

Browne, Butler and Lindley each contribute a similar verse in turn in ascending vocal ranges. It was released as a single and reached number 20 in the U.S. as well as number 12 in the UK.

Charts

Dreamhouse version

British reggae fusion pop/dance trio Dreamhouse released their version of "Stay" as their debut single in 1995, which reached No. 62 on the UK Singles Chart. In the United States, it was released in 1998 as the lead single from the U.S. album Dreamhouse. In a positive review for the 13 June 1998 issue of Billboard magazine, the song was featured in the "New & Noteworthy" section, saying "This wildly appealing working-class UK trio is poised to seriously penetrate the stateside market with an instantly infectious dance rendition of Maurice Williams' pop chestnut... Pop music doesn't get much more obvious than this single, which is destined to become the guilty top 40 pleasure of the summer season."

Cyndi Lauper version

"Stay" was the third and final single from Cyndi Lauper's 2003 album At Last. It was a promo-only single, released only in the U.S., Australia and France. The video that accompanied it is rarely seen but is commercially available as a special feature on the DVD, Live at Last. The single peaked at No. 64 on the French Singles Chart.

Other versions
In 1960, the song was covered by Little Joe and the Thrillers.
In 1964, the song was recorded by the Dave Clark Five on their studio album Glad All Over.
In 1966, the Virginia Wolves released a soul version of the song.
The song was recorded in 1968 by Jan & Dean for release on their album Carnival of Sound but the album was not released until 2010.
Singer-songwriter Andrew Gold recorded a version of "Stay" for his 1976 album What's Wrong with This Picture?.
Bruce Springsteen & the E Street Band recorded a version with Jackson Browne, Tom Petty and Rosemary Butler for the No Nukes album in September 1979.
In 1980, Austrian singer Georg Danzer wrote a German text to the Jackson Browne medley "The Load Out"/"Stay". It was performed live on the album Direkt as "Roadie Song".
Italo disco duo Marx & Spencer released their version in 1983.
In 1984, P.D.Q. Bach (a.k.a. Peter Schickele) lampooned the song in his opera The Abduction of Figaro in the aria "Stay with Me".
Lyrics from the song were interpolated on reggae artist Buju Banton's song "Hush Baby Hush" on his 1995 album 'Til Shiloh.
Australian group Human Nature included their version of the song on the 2014 album Jukebox''.

See also
List of Billboard Hot 100 number-one singles of 1960

References

1953 songs
1960 singles
1963 singles
1978 singles
1995 debut singles
Maurice Williams and the Zodiacs songs
The Hollies songs
The Four Seasons (band) songs
Jackson Browne songs
Dreamhouse (band) songs
Cyndi Lauper songs
Jan and Dean songs
Billboard Hot 100 number-one singles
Vee-Jay Records singles
Asylum Records singles
Ariola Records singles
Trauma Records singles
Sony Music singles
Song recordings produced by Bob Crewe
Song recordings produced by Jackson Browne